Formanek (or Formánek) is a Czech and Slovak surname. It may refer to:

Bedrich Formánek (born 1933), Slovak chess composer
Edward W. Formanek (born 1942), U.S. mathematician and chess player
Josef Formánek (born 1969), Czech writer, journalist, and traveler
Michael Formanek (born 1958), U.S. jazz musician
René Formánek (born 1975), Czech footballer